William A. Little may refer to:

William A. Little (Georgia judge), Justice of the Supreme Court of Georgia from 1897 to 1903
William A. Little (Nebraska judge) (c. 1832–1867), Justice of the Nebraska Supreme Court elected in 1867
William A. Little (physicist) (fl. 1960s–1970s), co-discoverer of the Little–Parks effect